was a former province in the area that is today the eastern half of Tottori Prefecture in the San'in region of Japan. Inaba was bordered by Hōki, Mimasaka, Harima and Tajima Provinces. In terms of the Gokishichidō system, Inaba was one of the provinces of the San'indo circuit. Under the Engishiki classification system, Inaba was ranked as one of the 35 "superior countries" (上国) in terms of importance, and one of the "near countries" (近国) in terms of distance from the capital. The provincial capital was located in what is now the city of Tottori. The ichinomiya of the province is the Ube shrine also located in the city of Tottori.

History
"Inaba" has been written in a variety of kanji. The ancient Kojiki uses "稲羽", whereas the Kujiki uses "稲葉" to name only a couple of examples. Inaba has been settled since the Japanese Paleolithic and the remains of Yayoi and Kofun period settlements and burial mounds have been found in several locations. During the late Kofun period to Asuka period, the Inaba kuni no miyatsuko was the Ifukube clan. A princess from this clan (Ifukibe no Tokotari) served as maid of honor at the court of Emperor Mommu and her grave in what is now the city of Tottori is a National Historic Site.  During the Muromachi period, the Yamana clan were nominally shugo of the province; however, their control over the province was very weak, and local warlords and aggressive neighbors often usurped Yamana authority. In the Sengoku period, the province was a contested area between the Mōri clan and Oda Nobunaga, with Nobunaga's general, Hashiba Hideyoshi eventually seizing control. In the Edo period, the entire province was ruled by a branch of the Ikeda clan as part of the 320,000 koku Tottori Domain centered on Tottori Castle..

Following the Meiji restoration and the abolition of the han system in 1871, Inaba became part of Tottori Prefecture on August 29,1871. However, Tottori was merged into Shimane Prefecture on August 21, 1876. It was separated back out on September 12, 1881.

Per the early Meiji period , an official government assessment of the nation’s resources, the province had 565 villages with a total kokudaka of 193,336 koku.

Gallery

Notes

References
 Nussbaum, Louis-Frédéric and Käthe Roth. (2005).  Japan encyclopedia. Cambridge: Harvard University Press. ;  OCLC 58053128

External links 

  Murdoch's map of provinces, 1903

Former provinces of Japan
inaba Province
History of Tottori Prefecture
1871 disestablishments in Japan
States and territories disestablished in 1871